Poulomi Ganguli is an Indian feminine given name. Notable people with the name include:

Poulomi Das (born 1996), Indian model and television actress 
Poulomi Desai, Indian multimedia artist
Poulomi Ghatak (born 1983), Indian table tennis player 

Indian feminine given names